Theodore Valentine Archibald (born 5 March 1998) is a Scottish professional footballer who plays as a right winger for EFL League Two club Leyton Orient. He is a product of the Celtic academy and was capped by Scotland at youth level.

Club career

Celtic 
A right winger, Archibald began his career in the academy at hometown club Celtic at a young age. He won the 2014–15 Glasgow Cup with the U17 team and signed a three-year professional contract. Archibald progressed through the youth ranks to be called into the U20 squad for three Scottish Challenge Cup matches early in the 2016–17 season and made his only appearance as a late substitute for Regan Hendry during a 5–1 first round victory over Annan Athletic on 2 August 2017. Archibald made appearances for the U19 team in the UEFA Youth League during the 2015–16 and 2016–17 seasons and helped the Development Squad to win the 2015–16 SPFL Development League title. Following a development loan at Scottish League One club Albion Rovers during the second half of the 2016–17 season, Archibald departed Celtic Park on 9 June 2017, after his contract expired.

Brentford 
On 12 May 2017, Archibald moved to England to sign a three-year B team contract with Championship club Brentford on a free transfer, effective 9 June 2017. He made three appearances early in the 2017–18 season, but drifted out of favour in late September 2017. He finished the season as the B team's second-leading scorer, with 14 goals.

Archibald joined League Two club Forest Green Rovers on loan for the duration of the 2018–19 season. He scored the first senior goal of his career on his 21st appearance, with a "stunning" 25-yard injury time strike to seal a 2–1 victory over Northampton Town on New Year's Day 2019. A lack of game time led to Archibald's recall to Brentford after the match. He had gained experience as a wing back while away on loan and was deployed in that position for the B team during the second half of the 2018–19 season. Archibald contributed to the B team's 2019 Middlesex Senior Cup Final victory and was an unused substitute during the first team's final match of the season. After a difficult two seasons off the field at Griffin Park, he was released on a free transfer in July 2019.

Macclesfield Town 
On 30 July 2019, Archibald signed a one-year contract League Two club Macclesfield Town on a free transfer, with the option of a further year. He made 33 appearances and scored six goals before his contract was cancelled on 13 May 2020.

Lincoln City 
On 24 August 2020, Archibald signed a one-year contract with League One club Lincoln City. During a 2020–21 season affected by injury and COVID-19, he made 12 appearances, scored one goal and did not feature during the Imps' unsuccessful 2021 play-off campaign. Archibald was retained for the 2021–22 season, but, with director of football Jez George unable to offer him regular football, he departed on a season-long loan in July 2021. Archibald transferred away from Sincil Bank in June 2022, though the club retained "a future interest in the player".

Leyton Orient 
On 29 July 2021, Archibald joined League Two club Leyton Orient on loan for the duration of the 2021–22 season. He made a career-high 42 appearances and scored eight goals during a mid-table season. On 8 June 2022, Archibald signed a two-year contract for an undisclosed fee.

International career 
Archibald was called up to a Scotland U14 training camp in 2012 and was capped at U16, U19 and U21 level. He was a member of the U16 squad which won the 2013–14 Victory Shield. Archibald won his only U21 cap as a late substitute for Oliver Burke in Scotland's 2–1 2019 UEFA European U21 Championship qualifying win over the Netherlands on 5 September 2017.

Style of play 
Brentford Head of Football Operations Robert Rowan described Archibald as "an inverted right winger, he's powerful, quick, direct and intelligent in possession". Of his preferred position, Archibald stated "I like either wing. I've played numerous positions. I've played left back, number 10, but ideally I like playing on the wing".

Personal life 
Archibald attended High School of Glasgow.

Career statistics

Honours 
Brentford B
 Middlesex Senior Cup: 2018–19
Scotland U16
 Victory Shield: 2013–14

References

External links

Theo Archibald at leytonorient.com

Living people
Scottish footballers
Brentford F.C. players
1998 births
Association football forwards
English Football League players
Albion Rovers F.C. players
Forest Green Rovers F.C. players
Scotland youth international footballers
Footballers from Glasgow
People educated at the High School of Glasgow
Scotland under-21 international footballers
Scottish Professional Football League players
Macclesfield Town F.C. players
Lincoln City F.C. players
Leyton Orient F.C. players